Temasek Life Sciences Laboratory (TLL) was established in August 2002 and as a Singapore Non Profit Philanthropic Research Organisation focusing primarily on understanding the cellular mechanisms that underlie the development and physiology of plants, fungi and animals which provides foundation for biotechnology innovation.

It is affiliated with the National University of Singapore and the Nanyang Technological University and is located within the campus of the National University of Singapore.

TLL has 230 researchers from about 20 different nationalities to engage in biomolecular science research and applications.

History 
Temasek Life Sciences Laboratory (TLL) is a beneficiary of Temasek Trust which oversees the initial endowment of S$500 million by Temasek to support corporate social responsibility philanthropic efforts in developing and delivering community programmes.

Temasek Life Sciences Laboratory and Temasek 
Temasek Life Sciences Laboratory (TLL) was founded in 2002 and funded by Temasek Trust, the philanthropic arm of Temasek.

Academic Programmes 
TLL offers various academic programmes at the tertiary level and is affiliated with the National University of Singapore and the Nanyang Technological University.

 PhD/Graduate Programme
Temasek Life Sciences Laboratory (TLL) offers an intensive PhD programme in Singapore that fosters productive scientific interactions between students, postdoctoral fellows, and PIs. Past candidates have had their work published in prestigious research journals and travelled widely to present their findings at international conferences. 

2. Internship Programmes

Research Attachment Programme (REAP)

The Research Attachment Programme (REAP) is jointly organised by the Ministry of Education (MOE), National University of Singapore (NUS) and TLL to groom local life sciences research talents.

The eight-week programme is designed for first-year Biology and Chemistry students in local junior colleges (JCs) to encourage these budding young science students to pursue a career in life sciences in future by stimulating their interest with hands-on training in research environment and interactions with professional scientists.

Undergraduate Programme (UTP)

The Undergraduate Programme (UTP) promotes scientific exchange and research collaboration between TLL and the top-tier China and India universities, where final year undergraduates are given the opportunity to execute research projects at TLL for 3 to 4 months.

Graduate Attachment Programme (GAP)

The Graduate Attachment Programme (GAP), which lasts for 3 to 6 months, exposes Singaporeans and Singapore Permanent Resident (PR) fresh graduates to the R&D environment to encourage them to pursue a career in research.

Other Training

TLL also participates in the attachment programmes offered by Nanyang Polytechnic, Ngee Ann Polytechnic, Republic Polytechnic,Singapore Polytechnic, and Temasek Polytechnic.

Publications
Since its inception, TLL has made over 60 inventions and published over 730 papers in peer-reviewed journals, of which more than 25 percent are in high impact research journals like Nature. Headed by Emeritus Professor Chan Soh Ha, the research institute focuses on creating an environment which can attract the brightest young minds worldwide, support their research and challenge them.

In 2011, TLL published 59 papers in peer-reviewed journals and made five discoveries including the specific Enterovirus 711 monoclonal antibodies which can be further developed as potential therapeutics.

In 2012, TLL published 85 papers in peer-reviewed journals and made 11 discoveries, out of which five have been licensed.

Research overview 
At Temasek Life Sciences Laboratory (TLL), 230 scientists from about 20 countries undertake basic and applied research in cellular, molecular, and genetic biology.

The research efforts aim to address both the immediate and long-term needs of the life sciences industry with a particular focus on cell biology, developmental biology, genomes structural biology and molecular pathogenesis.

Notable research methodology includes the adaptation of a range of molecular and cell biology approaches and the use of computational data mining to understand the cellular mechanisms that underlie the development and physiology of plants, fungi and animals.

One third of TLL’s research programmes is directed at practical research such as improving non-food biofuel sources and developing rapid diagnostic test kits, therapeutics and vaccines for emerging infectious diseases such as the H5N1 bird flu virus.

Under the PhD/Graduate Programme, TLL supervised 90 PhD candidates with their thesis research being carried out in various laboratories within TLL.

References 

2002 establishments in Singapore
National University of Singapore
Nanyang Technological University
Research institutes in Singapore
Life sciences industry